Yatrus Promontory is the predominantly ice-free promontory projecting 8 km in east direction from Trinity Peninsula, Graham Land into Prince Gustav Channel south of Eyrie Bay, and ending in Jade Point to the east and Bald Head to the southeast.

The feature is named after the ancient Roman town of Yatrus in Northern Bulgaria.

Location

German-British mapping in 1996.

Maps
 Trinity Peninsula. Scale 1:250000 topographic map No. 5697. Institut für Angewandte Geodäsie and British Antarctic Survey, 1996.
 Antarctic Digital Database (ADD). Scale 1:250000 topographic map of Antarctica. Scientific Committee on Antarctic Research (SCAR). Since 1993, regularly updated.

References
 Yatrus Promontory. SCAR Composite Antarctic Gazetteer
 Bulgarian Antarctic Gazetteer. Antarctic Place-names Commission. (details in Bulgarian, basic data in English)

Headlands of Trinity Peninsula
Bulgaria and the Antarctic